Ingulets Iron Ore dressing Works (Ingulets GOK) is a mining and processing plant which produces metallurgical products. The company is based in Kryvy Rih, Ukraine. Ingulets GOK sources iron ore from the deposits of ferruginous (iron oxide-containing) quartzite at the Inhulets deposit. Ingulets is a Russian romanization of Ukrainian name Inhulets (see Ge (Cyrillic)).

History

 1965 is considered the year of establishment of GOK, when the first merchant iron ore concentrate was produced.
 1978 the peak output was recorded in GOK over its history, 14 587 Ktonnes of concentrate produced
 2001 - the billionth tonne of concentrate produced
 2007 - Ingulets GOK was acquired by Metinvest

Production

GOK currently mines iron ore from its one open-pit quartzite field through a process of drilling and blasting, and by the removal of overburden to external dumps. The iron ore is then transported by rail to, and refined at, Ingulets GOK’s beneficiation and flotation facilities. The Company's product range includes granite overburden goods, expanded plastic goods and community services. 
In 2009, Ingulets GOK’s output was 11.3 million tonnes of merchant iron ore concentrate.

Infrastructure
GOK's infrastructure includes 17 structural units (workshops), among them 7 principal ones.

Exports
Ingulets GOK exports its products to Austria, Bulgaria, Romania, Slovakia, Czech Republic, Hungary, Poland and the countries of the Commonwealth of Independent States.

References

External links 
 Ingulets GOK official website

Metinvest
Iron ore mining companies
Metal companies of Ukraine
Mining companies of Ukraine
Mining companies of the Soviet Union
Kryvyi Rih